Eugenisee is a lake at Engelberg in the canton of Obwalden, Switzerland. In summer, it is stocked with brown trout and rainbow trout for fishing. In the floods of August 2005, the lake was filled with large quantities of sediments.

See also
List of mountain lakes of Switzerland

Notes

Lakes of Switzerland
Engelberg
Lakes of Obwalden